Vincent Lee Wimbush is an American New Testament scholar, known for his work in African American biblical hermeneutics.

Biography 
Wimbush received a BA in philosophy from Morehouse College (1975), an M.Div. (1978) from Yale Divinity School, and an AM (1981) and Ph.D. (1983) from Harvard University in the study of religions, with a focus on the New Testament. He taught at a number of institutions, including Union Theological Seminary (1991–2003) and Claremont Graduate University (2003–2014). He is the founding director of the Institute for Signifying Scriptures.

In 2010, Wimbush was the president of the Society of Biblical Literature.

African American biblical hermeneutics 
Wimbush is a pioneer in the field of African American biblical hermeneutics. He has argued for a need to challenge a Eurocentric understanding of biblical studies. Instead, scholars are to refocus the discipline within the context of North America, with a particular emphasis on the African-American experience. This would result in a hermeneutic that is much more informed by "marginality, liminality, exile, pain, trauma."

Works

References 

20th-century biblical scholars
21st-century biblical scholars
African-American biblical scholars
American biblical scholars
Harvard University alumni
Living people
New Testament scholars
Yale Divinity School alumni
Year of birth missing (living people)
21st-century African-American people